Jonas Aas (28 September 1890 – 9 February 1971) was a Norwegian footballer. He played in three matches for the Norway national football team from 1913 to 1915.

References

External links
 
 

1890 births
1971 deaths
Norwegian footballers
Norway international footballers
Place of birth missing
Association football forwards
Odds BK players